The Hills Football Association is an Australian rules football leagues based in Western Australia.  The association was formed in 1946.  The inaugural clubs were Chidlow, Mundaring, Parkerville, Sawyers Valley and Mt Helena. All clubs were within the Shire of Mundaring.

During the 1970s, 1980s and 1990s thirty-two clubs joined and left the Hills Football Association. During the late 1990s there were two divisions, with six clubs in the first division and eight in the second. Second division last competed in 2001.

Current clubs

Former clubs

Grand final results 
Division 1

Division 2

Ladders

2008
																			
																			
Finals

2009
																			
																			
Finals

2010
																		
																		
Finals

2011
																		
																		
Finals

2012
																		
																		
Finals

References 

 A Way of Life - The Story of country football in Western Australia - Alan East

Australian rules football competitions in Western Australia